An incomplete list of films produced in Japan ordered by year in the 1910s.  For an A–Z of films see :Category:Japanese films.  Also see cinema of Japan.

1910

1911

1912

1913

1914

1915-1919

References

External links
 Japanese film at the Internet Movie Database

1910s
Japanese
Films
1910s Japanese films